Yeh Mohabbat Hai is a 2002 Indian Hindi-language action film directed by Umesh Mehra, starring Rahul Bhat, Johnny Lever, Parikshit Sahni, Akanksha Malhotra, Mohnish Behl, Gulshan Grover, Arbaaz Khan, Nasir Khan and Danny Denzongpa.

Plot
Yeh Mohabbat Hai revolves around Chand & Shaheen, who are lovers from childhood. But her brother Shaukat (Mohnish Behl) is opposite from them. Chand gathers his team to play a cricket game. Due to his naivety, he gets trapped in terrorists links of Abdul Jameel (Arbaaz Khan). Police Inspector Chauthe (Sadashiv Amrapurkar) claims that he has sufficient evidence to convict Chand. Shaheen believes that Chand is innocent and till he doesn't prove his innocence, she will not marry him. So with the help of his friends Jaggi, Raj and Gullu, they set out to prove his innocence.

Cast
Rahul Bhat - Chand
Akanksha Malhotra - Shaheen
Nasirr Khan - Raj
 Pinky Campbell - Rohini
Johnny Lever - Jaggi
Parikshit Sahni - Chand's dad
Danny Denzongpa - Amaan Khan
Mohnish Behl - Shaukat
Gulshan Grover - Gullu
Arbaaz Khan - Abdul Jameel
 Shakti Kapoor - Baggad Singh
 Rakesh Bedi - Chacha
 Anjana Mumtaz - Chand's Mother
 Dolly Bindra - Jyoti
 Sadashiv Amrapurkar - Police Inspector
 Avtar Gill - Gafoor Khan
 Rana Jung Bahadur -
 Pappu Polyester -
Shama Sikander - Special Appearance in song 'Aaj Ghar Piya Viraje'

Music
All lyrics by Dev Kohli. Music by Anand Raj Anand
"Yeh Dil Deewana Hai" - Kavita Krishnamurthy, Abhijeet
"Chand Samne Hai" - Alka Yagnik, Sonu Nigam
"Aaj Ghar Piya Mila De" - Shubha Mudgal
"Mar Gayi Chhokri" - Sapna Awasthi, Sunidhi Chauhan
"Bechain Meraa Yeh Dil Hai" - Alka Yagnik, Udit Narayan
"Chill, Chill, Chill Man" - Harry Anand, Shaan, Sunidhi Chauhan

Filming
The entire film was shot in Khiva, Uzbekistan

References

External links

2000s Urdu-language films
Indian romantic action films
2000s romantic action films
Films scored by Anand Raj Anand
Films shot in Uzbekistan
Films directed by Umesh Mehra